From 1996 to 2007, Guatemala was one of the major providers for children for international adoption, peaking at 5,577 children adopted in 2007. Since reforms in 2007–08, aimed at combating extensive corruption in the adoption process, the numbers have fallen drastically. However, the numbers of children placed with Guatemalan families has remained roughly constant at around 250 per year both before and after the new legislation.

International adoption

International adoption from Guatemala increased fourfold from 731 in 1996 to 3289 in 2002, when Guatemala ratified the Hague Adoption Convention in response to widespread reports of corruption and coercion in the system. However, in late 2003 the ratification was overturned by the Constitutional Court of Guatemala, and adoptions resumed. They peaked in 2007, when 5,577 Guatemalan-born children were adopted abroad, with 4,728 of these going to the United States; following the failed ratification in 2003, most other developed countries had prevented further adoptions from Guatemala. The system was heavily criticised for corruption, coercion and a lack of transparency; large numbers of the adopted babies were effectively purchased from women in rural districts, and as many as 500 cases of kidnapping were believed to be linked to children who were later adopted overseas.

The adoption legislation was heavily reformed in late 2007 to become compliant with the Hague Convention, and international adoptions effectively ceased in 2008. The new system is still viewed as flawed and ineffective; of 153 cases studied in 2010, 78% infringed the new legislation in some way, with as many as 50% involving children who were declared adoptable without a thorough investigation of their background or full attempts to identify their birth families.

Pending the development of a robust adoption system, the US now only approves transitional cases, where adoption had begun before the Hague ratification, and adoption numbers have dropped as low as 32 in 2011.

Domestic adoption

Domestic adoption has, in recent years, been much less common than international adoption in Guatemala. In 2006, during the period of active international adoption, it was estimated that only 5% of adoptees were placed with Guatemalan families, which would be around 250 children. In 2009, 559 children in institutions were declared legally adoptable; of these, 253 were placed with Guatemalan families.

References

External links
 Dateline NBC report on Guatemalan adoption
 Consejo Nacional de Adopciones  

Guatemala
Law of Guatemala
Guatemala